Jennifer George (née McNaught; born 9 April 1983) is a Scottish professional racing cyclist, who currently rides for UCI Women's Continental Team . Born in Glasgow, George grew up in Darvel, Ayrshire. George began cycling in 2012, with London club Dulwich Paragon CC, but soon found success winning the Scottish National Road Race Championships in 2018 and 2019.

See also
 List of 2016 UCI Women's Teams and riders

References

External links
 

1983 births
Living people
Scottish female cyclists
Sportspeople from East Ayrshire